Slovakia competed at the 2020 Winter Youth Olympics in Lausanne, Switzerland from 9 to 22 January 2020.

Medalists

Alpine skiing

Boys

Girls

Biathlon

Boys

Girls

Mixed

Bobsleigh

Cross-country skiing

Boys

Girls

Freestyle skiing

Ski cross

Ice hockey

Girls' tournament

Roster

 Laura Medviďová
 Simona Macková
 Nikola Janeková
 Zuzana Dobiášová
 Emma Donovalová
 Barbora Kapičáková
 Tereza Belková
 Emma Bianka Živčáková
 Lea Giertlová
 Mária Nemčeková
 Laura Jancsóová
 Hana Fančovičová
 Lea Glosíková
 Nina Hudáková
 Kristína Slováková
 Lily Stern
 Viktória Kučerová

Preliminary round

Semifinals

Bronze medal game

3x3 tournaments

Boy's Teams

Preliminary round

All times are local (UTC+1).

Semifinals

Bronze medal game

Gold medal game

Girls' Teams

Preliminary round

All times are local (UTC+1).

Semifinals

Bronze medal game

Gold medal game

Luge

Individual sleds

Mixed team relay

Short track speed skating

Girls

Ski mountaineering

Individual

Sprint

Mixed team relay

Snowboarding

Snowboard cross

Slopestyle

Big air

References

2020 in Slovak sport
Nations at the 2020 Winter Youth Olympics
Slovakia at the Youth Olympics